Eugen Huth (February 16, 1901 – July 3, 1976) was a German politician of the Christian Democratic Union (CDU) and former member of the German Bundestag.

Life 
In 1945 he participated in the foundation of the CDU, whose district chairman he became in 1947. Huth was a member of the Wuppertal city council and chairman of the CDU faction there. From 1949 to 1961 he was a member of the German Bundestag, to which he was always directly elected in the constituency of Wuppertal II.

Literature

References

1901 births
1976 deaths
Members of the Bundestag for North Rhine-Westphalia
Members of the Bundestag 1957–1961
Members of the Bundestag 1953–1957
Members of the Bundestag 1949–1953
Members of the Bundestag for the Christian Democratic Union of Germany